Beginnings is a collection of science fiction stories and poems by American writer Gordon R. Dickson. It was first published by Baen Books in 1988. Most of the stories originally appeared in the magazines Astounding, Future, Analog Science Fiction and Fact, Fantastic, Fantasy and Science Fiction, Galaxy Science Fiction, Fantastic Universe and Worlds of Tomorrow. The poems first appeared in The Final Encyclopedia.

Contents

 Foreword
 "The Brown Man"
 "Danger—Human!"
 "Cloak and Stagger"
 "Three-Part Puzzle"
 "Seats of Hell"
 "Listen"
 "Soldier, Ask Not"
 "Strictly Confidential"
 "Powerway Emergency"
 "Idiot Solvant"
 "On Messenger Mountain"
 untitled poem

References

1988 short story collections
Short story collections by Gordon R. Dickson
American poetry collections